Kamel Kaci-Saïd (born 13 February 1967) is an Algerian football manager and former international football player.

Honours

As player
 African Cup of Champions Clubs: Champion 1996 (Zamalek SC)
 CAF Super Cup: Champion 1997 (Zamalek SC)

As manager
 Algerian Cup: Winner 2014 (MC Alger)

External links
 Kamel Kaci-Saïd profile - carfootal.dz

1967 births
Living people
Algerian footballers
Algeria international footballers
Footballers from Algiers
Ligue 1 players
RC Kouba players
CS Hammam-Lif players
USM Blida players
Zamalek SC players
AS Cannes players
MO Constantine players
MC Alger players
NA Hussein Dey players
1996 African Cup of Nations players
1998 African Cup of Nations players
Expatriate footballers in Tunisia
Expatriate footballers in France
Algerian expatriate footballers
Algerian expatriate sportspeople in Tunisia
Algerian expatriate sportspeople in Egypt
Algerian expatriate sportspeople in France
MC Alger managers
Association football forwards
Egyptian Premier League players
Algerian football managers
21st-century Algerian people